The Baytown Site (3 MO 1) is a Pre-Columbian Native American archaeological site located on the White River at Indian Bay, in Monroe County, Arkansas. It was first inhabited by peoples of the Baytown culture (300 to 700 CE) and later briefly by peoples of the Plum Bayou culture (650 to 1050 CE), in a time known as the Late Woodland period. It is considered the type site of the Baytown culture.

The site was added to the National Register of Historic Places on May 13, 1976, as NRIS number 76000440.

Description
The site consisted of nine platform mounds arranged around an open plaza.

See also
National Register of Historic Places listings in Monroe County, Arkansas
Culture, phase, and chronological table for the Mississippi Valley

References

Baytown culture
Archaeological sites on the National Register of Historic Places in Arkansas
Geography of Monroe County, Arkansas
National Register of Historic Places in Monroe County, Arkansas